In Aztec mythology, Yacatecuhtli was a patron god of commerce and travelers, especially business travelers. His symbol is a bundle of sticks. Merchants would carry an uttal cane as they moved from village to village peddling their wares, and at night-time would tie them together into a neat bundle before sprinkling them with blood from their ears. It was believed that this ritual in Yacatecuhtli's honor would guarantee success in future business ventures, not to mention protection from vicious beasts and robbers on their journeys.

His name means "lord of the nose" (Nahuatl yacatl, nose and tecuhtli, lord).

References 

Aztec gods
Commerce gods
Abundance gods